Aliobası is a village in the Amasra District, Bartın Province, Turkey. Its population is 286 (2021).

History 
The name of the village is mentioned as Alabaş in the records of 1907.

Geography 
The village is 33 km from Bartın city and 17 km from Amasra town.

References

Villages in Amasra District